James M. Wise (born July 30, 1964) is an American actor, singer, writer and composer. He is perhaps best known for his recurring role as Coach Tugnut in the Disney Channel Original Series Even Stevens. He is also known for his voice-over work in video games, movies and TV shows.

Wise's other television acting credits include That's So Raven, JAG, Veronica's Closet, Friends, The Secret World of Alex Mack, Suddenly Susan, Wizards of Waverly Place, Invader Zim and among other series. He also provided the voice of Loud Howard on Dilbert: The Series, played the football announcer in the 2001 film Not Another Teen Movie, and played a resort guest in the 2002 Philip Seymour Hoffman tragicomedy Love Liza.

As a singer and composer, he wrote all the songs featured in the Even Stevens episode "Influenza: The Musical" and wrote the song "Dream Vacation" for The Even Stevens Movie performed by Christy Carlson Romano; as well as three out of the six songs featured in the That's So Raven episode "The Road to Audition". In 2004, he provided the singing voice of SpongeBob SquarePants on the song "Goofy Goober Rock" in The SpongeBob SquarePants Movie. Wise has been nominated for the Primetime Emmy Award for Outstanding Original Music and Lyrics three times for his work on MadTV, winning once in 2006 alongside Greg O'Connor for the song "A Wonderfully Normal Day".

Wise is also an accomplished comedy writer, writing for the series MADtv (where he was once a head writer), Saturday Night Live and The Tonight Show with Jay Leno. He is an alum of The Groundlings comedy troupe.

Filmography

TV series
 100 Deeds for Eddie McDowd - Wilard
 Aaahh!!! Real Monsters - Rap Singer, Preacher
 Alright Already - Johnny
 American Dad! - Mr. Durbin
 Batman Beyond - Maddie
 Best Time Ever with Neil Patrick Harris - (writer - 8 episodes)
 Clerks: The Animated Series
 Dilbert - Loud Howard
 Even Stevens - Coach Tugnut
 Father of the Pride - Turkey
 Foxworthy's Big Night Out - (writer - 1 episode)
 Free Ride - The Beeze
 Friends - Kyle 
 Heavy Gear: The Animated Series - Von Maddox
 Higglytown Heroes - Fripp, Sanitation Worker Hero
 In Living Color - Himself
 Instant Comedy with the Groundlings - Himself
 Invader ZIM - Sizz-Lor, Goons, Alien #2 (Abductor Green)
 It's Garry Shandling's Show - Game Player
 JAG - Club Emcee, Mickey Gallo
 Just Shoot Me! - Kenny
 Justice League - Bouncer
 Lois & Clark: The New Adventures of Superman - Man #1
 MADtv - Mitch Stein, Cary Eggett, Guitar Player in Band, Morley Safer
 Men in Black: The Series - Himself
 My Life as a Teenage Robot - Captain, Critter #3, Patrolman #1
 Once and Again - Tom
 Race to Space - Air Policeman
 Random Acts of Comedy - Himself
 Sabrina, The Teenage Witch - Brady
 Saturday Night Live - (2 episodes)
 Sisters - Photographer
 Son of the Beach - FBI Agent
 Step by Step - Trainer
 Suddenly Susan - Mike
 That's So Raven - Aldo
 The Arsenio Hall Show - (38 episodes)
 The Batman - Detective
 The Drew Carey Show - Karaoke DJ, Harry the Tuba
 The Jay Leno Show
 The Secret World of Tyler Mack - Chester, Janitor
 The Tonight Show with Jay Leno - Cowboy Bob, Wick Tompkins, Ronnie Fisk, Host of 'Elderly Say the Darnest Things', Jim Wise - NBC Vice President of Promotional Relations, Yorick Wise, Larry the Quaker, Audience Corrdinator, Santa Claus, Bieber Baby, Middle-Aged Harry Potter, Doctor
 The Zeta Project - Dr. Byrne
 Veronica's Closet - Steve, Heckler
 Wizards of Waverly Place - Mr. Malone
 Zoe, Duncan, Jack & Jane - Matt

TV specials
 2014 MTV Video Music Awards - (creative consultant)

Film
 A Bucket of Blood - Guitar Player, Singer
 A Night at the Roxbury - New Club Waiter
 Batman: The Dark Knight Returns - Part 1 - Femur
 Bloodfist IV: Die Trying - Pizza Cop
 Body Waves - Dooner
 Casper Meets Wendy - Hungry Fan
 Chicks - Marcus the Blind Masseur
 Clockwatchers - Man in Bar
 Danny Roane: First Time Director - Animal Wrangler
 Green Lantern: First Flight - Lieutenant
 Guys Choice Awards 2015
 Guys Choice Awards 2016
 Hollywood Chaos - Waterfront Café Manager
 Hoovey - Basketball Announcer
 Hostile Intentions - Boyfriend
 Hotel Transylvania - Shrunken Head, Hydra
 Hotel Transylvania 2 - Additional voices
 Love Liza - Bland Man
 Michael Jordan: An American Hero - Reporter
 Nickelodeon Kids' Choice Awards 2016 - (creative consultant)
 Not Another Teen Movie - Football Announcer
 Pitbull's New Year's Revolution
 Race to Space - Air Policeman
 Revenge of the Red Baron - Lead Medic
 Scooby-Doo! Music of the Vampire - Henry
 Showgirls - Loudmouth at Cheetah
 Soup of the Day - Dave
 Space Jam - Police Assistant (uncredited)
 Talladega Nights: The Ballad of Ricky Bobby - Jim Bohampton
 The Enigma with a Stigma - Jack Durham
 The Even Stevens Movie - Coach Tugnut
 The Guys
 The SpongeBob SquarePants Movie - SpongeBob's Singing Voice (uncredited)
 TV Land Icon Awards 2016 - (written by)

Shorts
 The Amazing Adventures of Spider-Man - Electro

Video games
 Escape from Monkey Island - Manatee Operator, Starbuccaneer's Clerk
 EverQuest II - Additional voices
 The SpongeBob SquarePants Movie - Additional voices
 Tony Hawk's Pro Skater 3 - Additional voices
 X-Men: Next Dimension - Additional voices

References

External links

Living people
20th-century American male actors
21st-century American male actors
Male actors from California
American comedy writers
American male film actors
American television composers
American male television actors
American male voice actors
Musicians from California
Writers from California
1964 births